Greg Nibert (born January 3, 1958) is an American politician who has served in the New Mexico House of Representatives from the 59th district since 2017.

References

1958 births
Living people
Republican Party members of the New Mexico House of Representatives
21st-century American politicians